Nonville is the name of two communes in France:

 Nonville, in the Seine-et-Marne département
 Nonville, in the Vosges département